Dean Stalham (born c. 1963) is a British self-taught artist, playwright and community activist from North London. He has spent time in prison for handling stolen artworks.

Whilst serving time in Wandsworth Prison he won a prize for his art from the Koestler Trust.

He founded the Art Saves Lives charitable organisation in 2007.

In 2010 he wrote a play, God Don't Live on a Council Estate, and staged it using a tiny budget in an old council office building in New Cross. WhatsonStage.com described it as "an emotionally gripping and riveting production", while theguardian.com called it "different" and "of high quality".

References

Living people
1960s births
Year of birth missing (living people)
Artists from London
Founders of charities